Raymond Girard (1901–1989) was a French film and stage actor.

Filmography

References

Bibliography
 Hayward, Susan. French Costume Drama of the 1950s: Fashioning Politics in Film. Intellect Books, 2010.

External links

1901 births
1989 deaths
French male stage actors
French male film actors
Male actors from Paris